Barah also Bara is a town in North Kurdufan, central Sudan, in northeastern Africa. It is approximately 30 km north of El-Obeid, the capital of North Kurdufan. It is a regional transportation hub. It has a present population of 16,969

External links
 "Barah, Sudan" Falling Rain Genomics, Inc.

Populated places in North Kurdufan